Dilbert is an American adult animated sitcom produced by Adelaide Productions, Idbox and United Media, and distributed by Columbia TriStar Television. The series is an adaptation of the comic strip of the same name by Scott Adams, who also served as executive producer and showrunner for the series along with former Seinfeld writer Larry Charles. The first episode was broadcast on January 25, 1999, and was UPN's highest-rated comedy series premiere at that point in the network's history; it lasted two seasons with thirty episodes and won a Primetime Emmy for its title sequence.

Synopsis
The series follows the adventures of a middle-aged white-collar office worker, named Dilbert, who is extremely intelligent in regards to all things that fall within the boundaries of electrical engineering. Despite his intelligence he is unable to question certain processes that he believes to be inefficient, due to his lack of power within the organization. Thus, he is consistently found to be unsatisfied with the decisions that are made in his workplace, because he has many suggestions to improve the decision, yet is incapable of expressing them. Consequently, he is often found to show a pessimistic and frustrated attitude, which ultimately lands him in various comedic situations that revolve around concepts like leadership, teamwork, communication, and corporate culture.

History
The first season centers on the creation of a new product, the "Gruntmaster 6000". The first three episodes involve the idea process ("The Name", "The Prototype", and "The Competition" respectively); the fourth ("Testing") involves having it survive a malevolent company tester named "Bob Bastard", and the fifth ("Elbonian Trip") is about production in the famine-stricken fourth-world country of Elbonia. The prototype is delivered to an incredibly stupid family in Squiddler's Patch, Texas, during the thirteenth and final episode of the season, "Infomercial", even though it was not tested in a lab beforehand. The family's misuse of the prototype creates a black hole that sucks Dilbert in; he instantly wakes up in the meeting seen at the start of the episode, then locks his design lab to keep the prototype from being shipped out.

The second season features seventeen episodes, bringing the total number of episodes to thirty. Unlike the first season, the episodes are not part of a larger story arc and have a different storyline for each of the episodes (with the exception of episodes 29 and 30, "Pregnancy" and "The Delivery"). Elbonia is revisited once more in "Hunger"; Dogbert still manages to scam people in "Art"; Dilbert is accused of mass murder in "The Trial"; and Wally gets his own disciples (the result of a complicated misunderstanding, the company launching a rocket for NASA, and a brainwashing seminar) in episode 16, "The Shroud of Wally".

The theme music, "The Dilbert Zone", was written by Danny Elfman. It is an abbreviated instrumental rewrite of the theme from the film Forbidden Zone, originally performed by Elfman's band, The Mystic Knights of the Oingo Boingo.

Conception
Sony Pictures acquired the rights to produce new animated Dilbert content, as the development and production for the animated series began once Sony bought the rights. Scott Adams, the creator of Dilbert, decided to create the series for UPN because the network promised 13 episodes on air, while other networks would only consider the series against other programming options. Adams added to that "If we had gone with NBC, they would have given Dilbert a love interest with sexual tension." UPN was the sixth-ranked network at the time and picked up the show in hopes of broadening their appeal and to prove they were committed to riskier alternative shows. Adams stated about turning Dilbert into a series "It's a very freeing experience because doing the comic strip limits me to three (picture) panels with four lines or less of dialogue per issue, in the TV series, I have 21 minutes per episode to be funny. I can follow a theme from beginning to end, which will add lots of richness to the characters." Adams wanted the series to be animated because the live action version shot previously for FOX didn't translate well. Adams added to that "If Dilbert's going to be at the top of the Alps, you just draw it that way and you don't have to build an Alps scene. You can also violate some laws of physics, and cause and effect. People forgive it very easily. So it's much more freeing creatively."

Cancellation
On November 22, 2006, when Adams was asked why the show was canceled, he explained:

On June 28, 2020, Adams claimed on Twitter that the show was cancelled because he was white and UPN had decided to focus on an African-American audience, and that he had been "discriminated against".

Cast

Main
 Daniel Stern as Dilbert
 Chris Elliott as Dogbert
 Larry Miller as The Pointy-Haired Boss
 Gordon Hunt as Wally
 Kathy Griffin as Alice
 Jackie Hoffman as Dilmom
 Jim Wise as Loud Howard
 Tom Kenny as Ratbert, Asok, additional voices
 Gary Kroeger as Additional voices
 Maurice LaMarche as The World's Smartest Garbageman, Bob the Dinosaur, additional voices
 Tress MacNeille as Carol, Lena, additional voices
 Jason Alexander as Catbert

Griffin was starring in the NBC series Suddenly Susan during the time that Dilbert was in production. Under the terms of her contract with NBC, she could not receive on-screen credit for any roles in series that aired on other networks.

Guest stars
 Stone Cold Steve Austin as Himself
 Jennifer Bransford as Ashley
 Andy Dick as Dilbert's Assistant Alfonso
 Jon Favreau as Holden Callfielder
 Gilbert Gottfried as Accounting Troll
 Tom Green as Jerrold
 Christopher Guest as The Dupey
 Buck Henry as Dadbert
 Harry Kalas as Baseball Announcer
 Wayne Knight as Path-E-Tech Security Guard
 Jay Leno as Himself
 Eugene Levy as Comp-U-Comp's Plug Guard
 Camryn Manheim as Juliet
 Mr. Moviefone as Himself
 Chazz Palminteri as Leonardo da Vinci
 Jeri Ryan as Seven of Nine Alarm Clock
 Jerry Seinfeld as Comp-U-Comp
 Billy West as Vibrating Chair Salesman, Rioting Engineer (Pilot episode only)

Episodes

Season 1 (1999)

Season 2 (1999–2000)

Syndication
Dilbert has aired on Fox Kids in different countries, and aired on Comedy Central from 2001 to 2005, and later IFC from 2012 to 2013

Home media

Columbia TriStar Home Entertainment released the complete series on DVD in Region 1 on January 27, 2004. The set included some special features including trailers and clip compilations with commentary by Scott Adams, executive producer Larry Charles, and voice actors Chris Elliott, Larry Miller, Kathy Griffin, and Gordon Hunt. The DVDs can be played on some PCs and DVD players with Region 2.

The first disc contains seven episodes (1-7), the second disc contains six episodes (8-13), the third disc contains eight episodes (14-21), and the fourth disc contains nine episodes (22-30).

On November 8, 2013, it was announced that Mill Creek Entertainment had acquired the home video rights to the series. They re-released the complete series on January 21, 2014.

Reception
Ray Richmond of Variety.com liked the show stating "it's surely the wittiest thing the netlet has ever had the good fortune to schedule, and based on the opening two installments, it has the potential to score with the same upscale auds that flocked to "The Simpsons" and transformed Fox from a wannabe to a player a decade ago." David Zurawik of The Baltimore Sun gave the show a positive review stating "sit down tonight in front of the tube with more reasonable expectations, and you will find yourself smiling, if not laughing out loud at least once or twice." Terry Kelleher of People magazine picked Dilbert for "Show of the week" and said the show featured "smart, pointed humor aimed at corporate bureaucracy, mendacity and absurdity." In 2017, James Charisma of Paste magazine ranked the show's opening sequence #13 on a list of The 75 Best TV Title Sequences of All Time.

Ratings
Dilbert's premiere episode received a 7.3 rating from the nation's biggest 44 markets, the highest of the 1998–1999 season for UPN. Across the whole country, the premiere episode received a 4.2 rating.

Awards
Primetime Emmy: Outstanding Main Title Design – 1999

See also
Dilbert animated web shorts

References

External links

 

Dilbert
1999 American television series debuts
2000 American television series endings
1990s American animated comedy television series
1990s American sitcoms
1990s American workplace comedy television series
2000s American animated comedy television series
2000s American sitcoms
2000s American workplace comedy television series
American animated sitcoms
English-language television shows
Primetime Emmy Award-winning television series
Television shows based on comic strips
Television series by Adelaide Productions
Television series by Rough Draft Studios
Television series by Sony Pictures Television
UPN original programming